Ille Tuktash (1907–1957), also Ilya Tuktash, was a Chuvash writer and poet. He was a member of the USSR Union of Writers.

Early life 

Ille Tuktash was born Ilya Semyonovich Semyonov on 29 July 1907 in the village of Bolshiye Toktashi, in the Alikovsky District of the Chuvash Republic. He graduated from Alikovo Middle School.

Career 

He was a reporter between 1942 and 1944.

He was the author of the collections Verses (1930) and The Wind of the October (1932), as well as short stories and essays. His novella Bull Ravine (1932) dealt with the collectivization of Chuvash villages. Tuktash translated into Chuvash The Tale of Igor's Campaign (with I. Ivnik), M. A. Sholokhov's The Quiet Don (book 1), and the short stories of M. Gorky. He is known as a compiler of Chuvash folklore.

Ille died on 20 January 1957 in Cheboksary.

Tuktash created a genre of lyrical poetry including "Grow, motherland, get stronger", "White Pidgeon", and "Oh Motherland".

Works 
 «Сӑвӑсем» – Verses (1930)
 «Пӗрремӗш ҫӗнтерӳ» – First victory (1932)
 «Октябрь» – October
 «Вӑкӑр ҫырми» – Bull's ravine (1933)
 «Чечек ҫыххи» – Bunch of flowers (1939)
 «Павел Лаптев» – Pavel Laptev (1944)
 «Ҫӗр хуҫисем» – Terra owners (1954)
 «Сӑвӑсемпе юрӑсем» – Verses and Songs (1958).

Literature 
 Iur’ev, M. Pisateli sovetskoi Chuvashii. Cheboksary, 1975.
 Efimov L. I., "Элӗк Енӗ" (Alikovo District), Alikovo, 1994.
 "Аликовская энциклопедия", editing: Efimov L. I., Efimov E. L., Anan'ev A. A., Terernt'ev G. K., Cheboksary, 2009, .
 "Чӑваш литературин антологийӗ", editing: Gordeev D. V., Silem J. A. Cheboksary, 2003.  .

References

External links 
 Илья Семенович Тукташ (1907–1957). Поэт–песенник
 Выдающиеся люди Чувашии : Тукташ Илья Семенович 

1907 births
1957 deaths
Chuvash-language poets
Chuvash writers
People from Alikovsky District
Soviet poets
Soviet writers